Grassy Lake may refer to:

 Grassy Lake, Alberta, a hamlet in Canada
 Grassy Lake in Faulkner County, Arkansas
 Grassy Lake Dam, a small dam in Wyoming
 Grassy Lake (Florida), a lake in Highlands County, Florida
 Grassy Lake Preserve, a protected area in Florida
 Grassy Lake (Louisiana), a lake in St. Martin and Assumption Parishes
 Little Grassy Lake (Florida), a lake in Highlands County, Florida
 Little Grassy Lake (Illinois), a reservoir in southern Illinois

See also
 Grasset Lake, Quebec, Canada